John Bernard Blamo (born 1935) is a former politician in Liberia. He was foreign minister under Samuel Doe in 1986 and 1987. He was preceded by Ernest Eastman and replaced by J. Rudolph Johnson.

References

1935 births
Living people
Foreign Ministers of Liberia
Place of birth missing (living people)
Date of birth missing (living people)